Tylldalen is a village in Tynset Municipality in Innlandet county, Norway. Tylldalen Church is located in the village as well as a small primary school. The river Tysla runs through the village.

References

Tynset
Villages in Innlandet